The 1958 Ballon d'Or, given to the best football player in Europe as judged by a panel of sports journalists from UEFA member countries, was awarded to Raymond Kopa on 16 December 1958.

Rankings

References

External links
 France Football Official Ballon d'Or page

1958
1957–58 in European football